Ashley is a small town in North Canterbury, in the South Island of New Zealand. It used to have a railway station on the Main North Line that runs through the village.

Education
Ashley School is Ashley's only school, and was established in 1864. It is a decile 9 state co-educational full primary, with  students (as of  The principal is Craig Mullan.

Demographics
It is part of the wider Ashley-Sefton statistical area.

Ashley had a population of 312 at the 2018 New Zealand census, an increase of 51 people (19.5%) since the 2013 census, and an increase of 90 people (40.5%) since the 2006 census. There were 108 households. There were 153 males and 159 females, giving a sex ratio of 0.96 males per female. The median age was 35.5 years (compared with 37.4 years nationally), with 81 people (26.0%) aged under 15 years, 60 (19.2%) aged 15 to 29, 138 (44.2%) aged 30 to 64, and 36 (11.5%) aged 65 or older.

Ethnicities were 95.2% European/Pākehā, 8.7% Māori, 2.9% Asian, and 2.9% other ethnicities (totals add to more than 100% since people could identify with multiple ethnicities).

Although some people objected to giving their religion, 73.1% had no religion, 20.2% were Christian and 1.9% had other religions.

Of those at least 15 years old, 21 (9.1%) people had a bachelor or higher degree, and 63 (27.3%) people had no formal qualifications. The median income was $34,100, compared with $31,800 nationally. The employment status of those at least 15 was that 129 (55.8%) people were employed full-time, 57 (24.7%) were part-time, and 12 (5.2%) were unemployed.

Ashley-Sefton statistical area

Ashley-Sefton had a population of 2,139 at the 2018 New Zealand census, an increase of 186 people (9.5%) since the 2013 census, and an increase of 429 people (25.1%) since the 2006 census. There were 762 households. There were 1,065 males and 1,074 females, giving a sex ratio of 0.99 males per female. The median age was 45.1 years (compared with 37.4 years nationally), with 441 people (20.6%) aged under 15 years, 318 (14.9%) aged 15 to 29, 1,041 (48.7%) aged 30 to 64, and 339 (15.8%) aged 65 or older.

Ethnicities were 95.4% European/Pākehā, 6.6% Māori, 1.0% Pacific peoples, 1.8% Asian, and 1.5% other ethnicities (totals add to more than 100% since people could identify with multiple ethnicities).

The proportion of people born overseas was 13.7%, compared with 27.1% nationally.

Although some people objected to giving their religion, 57.2% had no religion, 33.7% were Christian, 0.3% were Muslim, 0.1% were Buddhist and 1.3% had other religions.

Of those at least 15 years old, 246 (14.5%) people had a bachelor or higher degree, and 354 (20.8%) people had no formal qualifications. The median income was $36,700, compared with $31,800 nationally. The employment status of those at least 15 was that 891 (52.5%) people were employed full-time, 318 (18.7%) were part-time, and 42 (2.5%) were unemployed.

Climate
The average temperature in summer is 15.9 °C, and in winter is 7 °C.

References

Waimakariri District
Populated places in Canterbury, New Zealand